The William & Mary Tribe women's volleyball program represents the College of William & Mary in NCAA Division I women's volleyball.

Postseason

NCAA Division I Tournament
The Tribe have appeared in the NCAA Division I Women's Volleyball Championship once. They have a record of 0–1.

See also
List of NCAA Division I women's volleyball programs

References